Saint-Dominique Aerodrome  is located at Saint-Dominique, Quebec, Canada.

Traffic at Saint-Dominique airfield is represented mainly by glider operations and motorgliders.

The CVVC Glider Club operates at Saint-Dominique Airport, glider and soaring flight operations normally span from April to November. Gliders under tow take off only from runway 33.

References

Registered aerodromes in Montérégie
Les Maskoutains Regional County Municipality